Elisha Young Fair (July 2, 1809 - December 23, 1886) was a lawyer and minister to Belgium under president James Buchanan from his appointment on June 14, 1858 through May 8, 1861. Fair lived in Montgomery, Alabama where he also worked as a lawyer. He was a delegate at Alabama's 1865 Constitutional Convention. While he was serving in Belgium, Henry Hotze served in Brussels.

Fair was the son of William Fair (1770-1851) and Elizabeth (Young) Fair (1774-1854). He was part of South Carolina College's class of 1834. He married Martha Ann Cornelia Wyatt April 21, 1849. Fair's grandson, James Quinton Smith, served as Attorney General of Alabama.

He is buried at Oakwood Cemetery in Montgomery.

See also
John Jacob Seibels

References

1809 births
1886 deaths
American lawyers

University of South Carolina alumni